Sir John Garrard, sometimes spelt Gerrard (c. 1546 – 7 May 1625), was a City of London merchant, a member of the Worshipful Company of Haberdashers, a Buckinghamshire landowner, and a Lord Mayor of London for the year 1601 to 1602.

Life
Garrard was a younger son of Sir William Gerrard, Garrard, or Garret, Haberdasher, of Dorney Court, Buckinghamshire, who had bought the manor of Dorney in 1542, going on to serve as Lord Mayor of London in 1555. His mother was Isabel, daughter of Julian Nethermill, of Coventry, and his paternal grandfather was John Gerrard, alias Garret, of Sittingbourne.

He was born about 1546, if his tomb correctly recorded his age at death. His father, Sir William, died in 1571, to be succeeded by the elder son, another William Garrard.
 
John Garrard became a member of the Worshipful Company of Haberdashers and
married Jane, the daughter of Richard Partridge, a citizen of the City of London, and with her had thirteen children, including John (born about 1585), Benedict, Anne, Elizabeth, Ursula, Jane (baptized 1602), and at least two other daughters, these eight surviving infancy. At least four other children died young: a son named John, who was born and died in 1597; Margaret (the twin of Jane), who was baptized in May 1602 and died in June 1603; another John, who was baptized in December 1604; and a son, Thomas.

In 1593, Garrard was one of the two Sheriffs of the City of London, and at Michaelmas 1601 he was elected Lord Mayor of London, the term of office being for one year.

Garrard sold the manor of Southfleet in Kent to Sir William Sedley of Aylesford.

On 24 January 1616, Garrard's wife died; Garrard himself died on 7 May 1625, to be buried with his wife, and like his father, in the church of St Magnus-the-Martyr, London. A monument to him, erected by his son Benedict Gerrard, survives there, and reads as follows.

His son and heir, another Sir John Garrard, or Gerrard, was created a baronet in 1623 (see Garrard baronets).

Arms
Garrard's arms were blazoned "argent, on a fess gules, a lion passant, argent; a crescent for difference".

References

1540s births
1625 deaths
Year of birth uncertain
17th-century English businesspeople
Sheriffs of the City of London
17th-century lord mayors of London
16th-century English businesspeople
English merchants
Haberdashers